Marco Emilio Nichetti (born 22 December 1996) is an Italian footballer who plays as a midfielder for Alessandria in .

Career

AlbinoLeffe
A graduate of the club's youth academy, Nichetti made his league debut on 28 September 2014, coming on as a late substitute for Mattia Corradi in a 1-0 home victory over Monza.

Alessandria
On 24 August 2022, Nichetti signed a two-year contract with Alessandria.

References

External links

1996 births
Living people
People from Lodi, Lombardy
Footballers from Lombardy
U.C. AlbinoLeffe players
U.S. Alessandria Calcio 1912 players
Serie C players
Italian footballers
Association football midfielders
Sportspeople from the Province of Lodi